Kyaw Min Than may refer to:
 Kyaw Min Than (bodybuilder)
 Kyaw Min Than (footballer)